The Bachkovo Monastery of the Dormition of the Theotokos   ( "Успение Богородично", Bachkovski manastir, Petritsonis Monasteri), archaically the Petritsoni Monastery  or Monastery of the Mother of God Petritzonitissa is a major Eastern Orthodox monastery in Southern Bulgaria. It is located on the right bank of the Chepelare River, 189 km from Sofia and 10 km south of Asenovgrad, and is directly subordinate to the Holy Synod of the Bulgarian Orthodox Church. The monastery is known and appreciated for the unique combination of Byzantine, Georgian and Bulgarian culture, united by the common faith.

History 
The monastery was founded in 1083 by Prince Gregory Pakourianos, a prominent statesman and military commander in the Byzantine service, as a Georgian-dominated Orthodox monastery. He set up a seminary(school) for the youth at the monastery. The curriculum included religion, as well as mathematics, history and music. In the 13th century, the Georgian and Chalcedonic Armenian monks of the Petritsioni (Bachkovo) Monastery lost their domination over the monastery, but their traditions were preserved until the beginning of 14th century and an Armenian Gospel from the 10th century that came from this monastery still exists today.
During the time of the Second Bulgarian Empire, Bachkovo Monastery was patronized by Tsar Ivan Alexander, which is evidenced by an image of him on the arches of the ossuary's narthex. It is believed that the founder of Tarnovo Literary School and last patriarch of the mediaeval Bulgarian Orthodox Church, Patriarch Euthymius, was exiled by the Turks and worked in the school of the monastery in the early 15th century.

Although the monastery survived the first waves of Turkish invasion in Bulgarian lands, it was then looted and destroyed, but restored near the end of the 15th century. The refectory, whose mural paintings by an anonymous painter bear a significant artistic value, was reconstructed in 1601 and the Church of Mary, still preserved today, was finished in 1604.

Bachkovo Monastery is the final resting place of both Patriarch Euthymius (1330–1404) and Patriarch Cyril (1953–1971).

Complex

Ossuary

The only part that has survived from the monastery's original structure is the ossuary, which has a specific architectural design and ancient frescoes, and is situated 300 m away from the contemporary monastery complex. It looks inaccessible when viewed from the north. The building has two storeys, of which only one can be seen from the south. From architectural point of view the plan of the ossuary looks foreign to the local traditions. It is reminiscent of Syrian-Palestine mortuaries with its two floors of identical design. Each floor has a narthex, a single nave and an apse. The ground floor is intended for a crypt and has 14 burial niches. It would appear that the original ossuary was designed to house fourteen specific corpses under the floor pavement. This style of ossuary is not found anywhere else in the world.
The apse on the upper floor, the church proper (known as The Holy Trinity Church), is semicircular on the inside and pentagonal on the outside with 3 openings to let some daylight into the altarplace. The building is vaulted. The ossuary is interesting with the methods of its construction. It represents a mixture of Georgian and Byzantine building traditions. The facade is attractively diversified with 8 blind niches and a succession of layers of brick and stone, joined with mortar. The ante chamber is separated from the church by thick walls and solid wooden doors, painted with the Georgian Cross depicting the strong influence of the Georgians in the construction and running of this monastery in the 11th and 12th Century. Above the doorway arch is the mural of the Madonna and child.

Cathedral

The Cathedral Church of the Virgin Mary (dating from 1604) is the place where a valuable icon of the Virgin Mary Eleusa from 1310 is kept (brought from Georgia). According to the legend, the icon is wonder-working, attracting many pilgrims. This church was built in the place of the monastery's oldest church destroyed by the Turks. The building has survived to this day in its original structure of a three- aisled, cruciform domed basilica with three pentagonal apses. A silver- gilded cross rising from the dome bears the inscription "Always win!" in Georgian. The murals in the spacious narthex were painted in 1643 and depict a life-size portraits of Georgi and his son Constantine, who were high-ranking notables in Istanbul and donors to the church. The frescoes in the nave were painted much later, in 1850, by Joan Mosch (master Mosko). The two central icons in the iconostasis are exactly dated – 1793. these the icons of The Holy Virgin and Jesus Christ. The woodwork — iconostasis, bishop's throne and the like, dates from the 18th century.

Church of the Archangels

Another medieval church of the monastery is the Archangels' Church dating back probably to the 12th century, the vaulted open narthex of which was painted by Zahari Zograf in 1841. The inside of the church was painted by the artist Joan Mosch in 1846.

Jujube tree
The broad branches of a jujube, brought from Georgia more than two centuries ago, stretch over the courtyard. A famous jujube brandy (djindjifilova rakia) is distilled in the monastery.

Works of art

The museum of the monastery has a rich exhibition of church plate, icons, books, the sword of Friedrich Barbarossa, a sultan's firman from 1452, a wood-carved cross with miniatures. A fresco of the Doomsday, painted by Zahari Zograf in 1850, is retained in the Saint Nicholas Church and is thought of as one of the most interesting works of art of the Bulgarian National Revival.

The “Panorama” mural

The “Panorama” mural, which runs along the outside wall of the refectory, represents the history of Bachkovo monastery pictorially. It provides a bird's eye view of the monastery with all the surrounding buildings at the time of the painting.

Under the influence of different atmospheric conditions like rain, snow, fog, cold, wind, the biggest scenic mural on the Balkan peninsula has preserved the freshness of its paint. The painter Alexi Atanasov, a Bulgarian from the town of Negush, worked in this region in the 19th century.

The year of the decoration can be determined by an inscription that was on the outside walls of the western monastery wing, which was burned in 1902. This inscription read:

“The following depiction was finished under the ministry of Abbot Cyril on 22 July 1846. The depiction has been made by my own hand, Alexi Atanasov from Negush.”

As a model, the painter used a copper print that was made in Vienna with the financial help of the merchant from Samokov, Petar Rana, in 1807. Alexi Atanasov added valuable details and pictorial elements of his own. The “Panorama” mural gives us rich information about the architectural ensemble of the monastery in the 19th century. The northern facades of the churches St Archangels Michael and Gabriel and The Holy Virgin, were painted, too. The monastic buildings with their big buttresses on the river side can be seen. Central place was given to the founders of the monastery, who were depicted in monastic attire. The Emperor Alexius Comnenus is among them. At their side are the donors from the 14th century: George and Gabriel. The surroundings of the monastery are shown: the nunnery in Assenovgrad; Assen's fortress; the chapels nearby. The painter gave us a good idea from ethnographical point of view, about the clothing of the aristocracy from Plovdiv and the festal clothing of the women in the Rhodopes, through the group of the people that are following the Procession of the Miraculous Icon. Details, such as the well in the northern courtyard and the belfry in the Church of the Archangels, are included. Scenes from the passionals of the two Saints George and Demetrius are depicted at the side of the “Panorama”.

The “Panorama” mural is exceptionally interesting because of its sheer size and because of its artistic impact and craftsmanship. The paints were made after a recipe by the painter himself, probably from grasses mixed with egg emulsion. The used painting technique is “fresco buono,” which is a mural art of painting that is applied on a smooth moist plaster. When the water evaporates the images emerge on the surface. The implication of this technique, with the great deal of artistic mastery, is why these murals look fresh today.

References

Cultural associations 
 Bachkovo Monastery is one of the locations in the 2005 bestseller novel The Historian by Elizabeth Kostova.

External links 

 Official website of the Bachkovo  Monastery
 Nikola Gruev's photo gallery of the Bachkovo Monastery
 Bulgaria.com page about the monastery
 Bachkovo Monastery at Bulgarian Monastery.com
 Byzantine Monastic Foundation Documents. Typikon of Gregory Pakourianos for the Monastery of the Mother of God Petritzonitissa in Backovo.
 Anna Comnena. “The Alexiad”, Translated by E.R.A. Sewter, Pengium Books Ltd., London, 1969, (reprinted in 2003), Pp. 560.
 Encyclopédie Universalis. Petritzos

 
Buildings and structures in Plovdiv Province
Christian monasteries in Bulgaria
Art museums and galleries in Bulgaria
Museums in Plovdiv Province
Religious museums in Bulgaria
Georgian Orthodox churches
Ossuaries
Rhodope Mountains
Christian monasteries established in the 11th century
1080s establishments in the Byzantine Empire
11th century in Bulgaria
Tourist attractions in Plovdiv Province
Byzantine church buildings
Byzantine architecture in Bulgaria
Medieval Bulgarian Orthodox church buildings
1083 establishments in Europe